Camilla Ottesen (born 11 November 1972 in Frederiksberg, Denmark) is a Danish television presenter, notable for having hosted the first Junior Eurovision Song Contest in 2003 with Remee. She won the 2003 Danish TV Manufacturers' Assocociation's award for best presenter in children's and youth programming.

References

External links

1972 births
Living people
Danish television presenters
Danish women television presenters
People from Frederiksberg